23 Aquilae is a binary star system in the equatorial constellation of Aquila. 23 Aquilae is its Flamsteed designation. The brightness of the star is diminished by 0.21 in magnitude because of extinction from interstellar dust and gas. The system is moving closer to the Earth with a heliocentric radial velocity of –23 km/s.

The primary component of this system is a magnitude 5.31 K-type giant star or bright giant with a stellar classification of K1. The star is radiating 165 times the luminosity of the Sun from its enlarged photosphere at an effective temperature of 4,740 K. Orbiting at an angular separation of 3.25 arcseconds is a magnitude 8.76 companion star.

References

External links
 Image 23 Aquilae
 HR 7319
 CCDM 19185+0105

K-type giants
K-type bright giants
Binary stars
Aquila (constellation)
BD+00 4168
Aquilae, 23
180972
094885
7319